Nais  may refer to:
 Naïs, an eighteenth-century opera by Jean-Philippe Rameau
 Naïs (film)
 Nais (Lydia), a town of ancient Lydia
 Naïs (mythology), several women in Greek mythology

Biology
 Nais (fungus), a genus of fungi in the family Halosphaeriaceae
 Nais (worm), a genus of oligochaete worms in the family Naididae
 Nais, an invalid genus of butterflies in the family Lycaenidae; nowadays part of Chrysoritis

See also
 NAIS (disambiguation)
 Nise (disambiguation)
 Nice (disambiguation)
 Gneiss, a type of metamorphic rock